The Territorial Prelature of Moyobamba is a Roman Catholic territorial prelature located in the city of Moyobamba in the Ecclesiastical province of Trujillo in Peru.

History
 March 7, 1948: Established as Territorial Prelature of Moyobamba from the Diocese of Chachapoyas

Bishops
 Prelates of Moyobamba (Roman rite), in reverse chronological order
 Bishop Rafael Alfonso Escudero López-Brea (July 21, 2007 – Present)
 Bishop José Ramón Santos Iztueta Mendizábal, C.P. (June 6, 2000 – July 21, 2007)
 Bishop Venancio Celestino Orbe Uriarte, C.P. (August 25, 1967 – June 6, 2000)
 Bishop Martin Fulgencio Elorza Legaristi, C.P. (January 15, 1949 – December 30, 1966)

Coadjutor prelates
José Ramón Santos Iztueta Mendizábal, C.P. (1998-2000) 
Rafael Alfonso Escudero López-Brea (2006-2007)

References
 GCatholic.org
 Catholic Hierarchy
  Prelature website (Spanish) 

Roman Catholic dioceses in Peru
Roman Catholic Ecclesiastical Province of Trujillo
Christian organizations established in 1948
Roman Catholic dioceses and prelatures established in the 20th century
Territorial prelatures
1948 establishments in Peru